Chuudail No. 1 is a 1999 Indian Hindi-language horror film directed by R. Kumar and produced by Gautam Dhariwal. The film was released on 16 July 1999 under the banner of Rachna Cine Arts.

Plot
The film starts with a threatening phone call where a lady is asked to hand over a secret file otherwise they will kill her father. Finally the group of goons kill her father mercilessly and rape the lady. They escape leaving her to die. While police officer Vicky is transferred to the area, the vengeful ghost of the lady possesses Vicky's wife and starts to murder the goons one by one.

Cast
 Shehzad Khan
 Razak Khan
 Dinesh Hingoo
 Rakhi Sawant
 Rajesh Vivek
 Sudhir
 Raj Kiran
 Mac Mohan
 Deepika Chikhalia
 Ishrat Ali
 Kaizar Khan
 Kiran Ali
 Gautam
 Pushpa Verma
 Anish Mathur

References

1999 films
1990s Hindi-language films
Indian horror films
1999 horror films
Hindi-language horror films
Indian horror drama films
Indian horror fiction
Indian erotic horror films

External links